Rasmus Christiansen may refer to:

 Rasmus Christiansen (actor) (1885–1964), Danish actor 
 Rasmus Christiansen (footballer, born 1988), Danish soccer player for Blokhus FC
 Rasmus Christiansen (footballer, born 1989), Danish soccer player

See also
Rasmus Christensen, Danish footballer b. 1991